Mayer is a census-designated place (CDP) in Yavapai County, Arizona, United States. The population was 1,408 at the 2000 census.  Mayer includes three sites listed on the National Register of Historic Places: Mayer Apartments, Mayer Business Block, and Mayer Red Brick Schoolhouse.

History
The place was originally called Wi:kidoʼyoʼ in Yavapai. A local legend holds that the English name came from a runaway boy with the last name of Mayer. From May to June 1942, 245 Japanese Americans were confined at the Mayer Assembly Center, one of 17 temporary detention camps built to hold Japanese Americans removed from the West Coast after the U.S. entered World War II. The 69 families were mostly from Maricopa County's Salt River Valley area, and lived in military-style barracks on the converted Civilian Conservation Corps camp for just under a month before being transferred to the more permanent and isolated internment camp at Poston, Arizona.

2017 wildfire 

The Goodwin Fire sparked on June 24, 2017, in the Bradshaw Mountains near the town of Mayer, which days later led to the evacuations of more than 100 residents. The wildfire burned 28,516 acres of land. Highway 69 was closed between the towns of Mayer and Dewey-Humboldt. The fire destroyed approximately five structures and injured one firefighter.

Geography
Mayer is located at  (34.419154, −112.249779).

Climate
According to the Köppen Climate Classification system, Mayer has a semi-arid climate, abbreviated "BSk" on climate maps.

Demographics

At the 2000 census there were 1,408 people, 585 households, and 379 families living in the CDP. The racial makeup of the CDP was 94% White, 1% Native American, 3% from other races, and 2% from two or more races.  9% of the population were Hispanic or Latino of any race.
Of the 585 households 26% had children under the age of 18 living with them, 52% were married couples living together, 8% had a female householder with no husband present, and 35% were non-families. 28% of households were one person and 13% were one person aged 65 or older.  The average household size was 2.4 and the average family size was 2.9.

The age distribution was 24% under the age of 18, 6% from 18 to 24, 23% from 25 to 44, 28% from 45 to 64, and 19% 65 or older.  The median age was 44 years. For every 100 females, there were 99.2 males.  For every 100 females age 18 and over, there were 97.6 males.

The median household income was $28,412 and the median family income  was $33,988. Males had a median income of $38,304 versus $21,417 for females. The per capita income for the CDP was $14,297.  About 14% of families and 19% of the population were below the poverty line, including 13% of those under age 18 and 17% of those age 65 or over.

Education
Most of Mayer CDP is in the Mayer Unified School District, while a small portion is in the Humboldt Unified School District.

National Register of Historic Places

The following pictured properties in Mayer are listed in the National Register of Historic Places:

See also

Joe Mayer
List of historic properties in Mayer, Arizona

References

External links

Census-designated places in Yavapai County, Arizona
Mining communities in Arizona